Wainwright Aerodrome  is located  south of Wainwright, Alberta, Canada.

References

External links
Place to Fly on COPA's Places to Fly airport directory

Registered aerodromes in Alberta
Municipal District of Wainwright No. 61